Nybergsund IL-Trysil is a Norwegian football club located in Nybergsund in Trysil. It currently plays in the 3. divisjon, the fourth tier of the Norwegian football league system, having been relegated from 2. divisjon in 2018.

Current squad

Recent history
{|class="wikitable"
|- style="background:#efefef;"
! Season
! 
! Pos.
! Pl.
! W
! D
! L
! GS
! GA
! P
!Cup
!Notes
|-
|2001
|2. divisjon
|align=right |6
|align=right|26||align=right|12||align=right|3||align=right|11
|align=right|43||align=right|37||align=right|39
|Third round
|
|-
|2002
|2. divisjon
|align=right |4
|align=right|26||align=right|12||align=right|4||align=right|10
|align=right|41||align=right|47||align=right|40
|Third round
|
|-
|2003
|2. divisjon
|align=right |3
|align=right|26||align=right|16||align=right|7||align=right|3
|align=right|74||align=right|30||align=right|55
|Second round
|
|-
|2004
|2. divisjon
|align=right |6
|align=right|26||align=right|10||align=right|9||align=right|7
|align=right|43||align=right|35||align=right|39
|Second round
|
|-
|2005
|2. divisjon
|align=right |3
|align=right|26||align=right|16||align=right|5||align=right|5
|align=right|57||align=right|26||align=right|53
|Third round
|
|-
|2006
|2. divisjon
|align=right |3
|align=right|26||align=right|15||align=right|8||align=right|3
|align=right|63||align=right|30||align=right|53
|First round
|
|-
|2007
|2. divisjon
|align=right bgcolor=#DDFFDD| 1
|align=right|26||align=right|20||align=right|3||align=right|3
|align=right|75||align=right|24||align=right|63
|Quarterfinal
|Promoted to the 1. divisjon
|-
|2008
|1. divisjon
|align=right |8
|align=right|30||align=right|12||align=right|6||align=right|12
|align=right|49||align=right|53||align=right|42
||Second round
|
|-
|2009
|1. divisjon
|align=right |9
|align=right|30||align=right|11||align=right|7||align=right|12
|align=right|49||align=right|54||align=right|40
||Second round
|
|-
|2010
|1. divisjon
|align=right |11
|align=right|28||align=right|9||align=right|8||align=right|11
|align=right|38||align=right|47||align=right|35
||Third round
|
|-
|2011
|1. divisjon
|align=right bgcolor="#FFCCCC"| 14
|align=right|30||align=right|6||align=right|5||align=right|19
|align=right|41||align=right|72||align=right|23
||Second round
|Relegated to the 2. divisjon
|-
|2012
|2. divisjon
|align=right |3
|align=right|26||align=right|13||align=right|5||align=right|8
|align=right|49||align=right|32||align=right|44
||Second round
|
|-
|2013
|2. divisjon
|align=right |6
|align=right|26||align=right|11||align=right|7||align=right|8
|align=right|50||align=right|56||align=right|40
||Second round
|
|-
|2014
|2. divisjon
|align=right |5
|align=right|26||align=right|11||align=right|8||align=right|7
|align=right|47||align=right|35||align=right|41
||Second round
|
|-
|2015
|2. divisjon
|align=right |8
|align=right|26||align=right|9||align=right|9||align=right|8
|align=right|50||align=right|49||align=right|36
||First round
|
|-
|2016
|2. divisjon
|align=right |5
|align=right|26||align=right|11||align=right|7||align=right|8
|align=right|52||align=right|45||align=right|40
||First round
|
|-
|2017 
|2. divisjon
|align=right |10
|align=right|26||align=right|9||align=right|4||align=right|13
|align=right|40||align=right|46||align=right|31
||Second round
|
|-
|2018 
|2. divisjon
|align=right bgcolor="#FFCCCC"| 12
|align=right|26||align=right|5||align=right|6||align=right|15
|align=right|26||align=right|58||align=right|21
||First round
|Relegated to the 3. divisjon
|-
|2019
|3. divisjon
|align=right |5
|align=right|26||align=right|13||align=right|3||align=right|10
|align=right|49||align=right|36||align=right|42
||First round
|
|-
|2020
|colspan="11"|Season cancelled
|-
|2021
|3. divisjon
|align=right bgcolor="#FFCCCC"| 12
|align=right|13||align=right|2||align=right|5||align=right|6
|align=right|11||align=right|23||align=right|11
||First round
|Relegated to the 4. divisjon
|}

References

External links
 Official website

Nybergsund I.L.
Association football clubs established in 1918
1918 establishments in Norway
Trysil